Dalimierz  (original German: Kurtshagen) is a village in the administrative district of Gmina Płoty, within Gryfice County, West Pomeranian Voivodeship, in north-western Poland.

References

Dalimierz